Henry Robert Morland (1716/1719 – 30 November 1797) was an English  portrait painter, best remembered for a portrait of King George III, and for being the father of the animal painter George Morland.

Life

His father was the genre painter George Henry Morland, and Henry Robert followed an art career as well, becoming a painter of portraits and domestic subjects, in both oil and crayon.

He exhibited some 118 works from 1760 to 1791 at the Society of Artists, the Free Society, and the Royal Academy. Morland also engraved in mezzotint, restored paintings, and sold artists supplies, including crayons that he made himself.
 
Morland was for a time very successful and even painted a portrait of George III, the king sitting in person. Although he became quite wealthy for a time, he lost most of his money, and was often bankrupt in later years.

He died on 30 November 1797 at Stephen Street, Rathbone Place, London, after having led an unsettled life.

Life
His wife Maria Morland was also an artist, and exhibited in 1785 and 1786 at the Royal Academy. Their son was the celebrated George Morland, one of the most popular painters of his day.

References

Attribution

External links
 Paintings by Henry Robert Morland in British Museums on Art UK

1710s births
1797 deaths
18th-century English painters
English male painters
English portrait painters
Year of birth unknown
Year of birth uncertain
18th-century English male artists